Oslavany is a town in Brno-Country District in the South Moravian Region of the Czech Republic. It has about 4,700 inhabitants.

Administrative parts
The village of Holasice is an administrative part of Oslavany.

Geography
It lies on the Oslava River. Most of the territory is located in the Boskovice Furrow, but the western part of the municipal territory extends into the Křižanov Highlands and Jevišovice Uplands.

History
The first written mention of Oslavany is from 1104. It was originally an agricultural and wine-growing village. In the 13th century, copper and other metals were mined in the adjacent hills. In 1225, the first Cistercian convert in Moravia was founded here. The village of Oslavany was owned by the convent until the 16th century. In 1525, Oslavany was acquired by the Althan family and the convent was rebuilt into a Renaissance residence.

In 1760, hard coal deposits were found here and soon it was the only place in Moravia where coal was mined. The greatest development of mining occurred in the 19th century and especially after 1913, when a power plant was established here. Coal mining and electricity generation changed the village both economically and environmentally. In the 1960s, the population of Oslavany grew rapidly as housing estates were built for the new employers. Coal mining ceased in 1973 and electricity production in 1993. As a result, the town has lost its industrial character.

Demographics

Sights
Oslavany Castle is a large Renaissance building with an arcaded courtyard. The original Gothic monastery church, which served as a castle chapel, has been preserved and is now used for concerts. Today the castle houses the Museum of Mining and Energy, and the Fire Museum.

Twin towns – sister cities

Oslavany is twinned with:
 Nováky, Slovakia
 Schkeuditz, Germany
 Vir, Croatia

References

External links

Populated places in Brno-Country District
Cities and towns in the Czech Republic